The 1982 Big Sky Conference men's basketball tournament was held March 5–6 at the Kibbie Dome at the University of Idaho in Moscow, Idaho.

Top-seeded Idaho defeated  in the championship game, 85–80, to clinch their second consecutive (and second overall) Big Sky men's basketball tournament.

Format
First played in 1976, the Big Sky tournament had the same format for its first eight editions. The regular season champion hosted and only the top four teams from the standings took part, with seeding based on regular season conference records. Idaho's sole conference loss was to Montana in Missoula.

Nevada–Reno made their first Big Sky tournament appearance in their third season in the conference.

Bracket

NCAA tournament
As Big Sky champions, the Vandals received an automatic bid to the 48-team NCAA tournament and were the third seed in the West region, behind Georgetown and Oregon State. Idaho received a first round bye, then played #16 Iowa in the second round in neighboring Pullman, winning in overtime. Four days later in the Sweet Sixteen in Provo, Utah, the Vandals fell to fourth-ranked and second seed Oregon State and finished with a  

The Big Sky has had a berth in the NCAA tournament since 1968, then a 23-team field; Idaho was the conference's sixth team to advance and the fifth to play in the Sweet Sixteen. Since the 1982 Vandals, only three Big Sky teams have advanced past the first round (Weber State (1995, 1999) and  Montana in 2006), and none went past the Round of 32.

References

Big Sky Conference men's basketball tournament
Tournament
Big Sky Conference men's basketball tournament
Big Sky Conference men's basketball tournament
Sports in Moscow, Idaho
Basketball competitions in Idaho
College sports tournaments in Idaho